Arnulfo Valentierra Cuero (born 16 August 1974) is a retired Colombian footballer.

Club career
Valentierra began his professional career with Once Caldas. In 2002, he was loaned to popular club América de Cali, but he remained with the diablos rojos only for six months, and moved back to Once Caldas prior to the start of the 2003 season. Then he relocated to the UAE where he played for local clubs Al-Wahda and Al-Ittihad in 2003. In 2004 he returned to Colombia's side Once Caldas and was a key piece in the team's Copa Libertadores championship in 2004. Upon his return to South America in 2005, he signed for Peruvian team Cienciano del Cuzco before joining Once Caldas for the third time around. He also had spells with Peñarol in the Primera División Uruguaya, and later with club Bolívar of the Liga de Fútbol Profesional Boliviano.

International career
Valentierra has made 11 appearances for the senior Colombia national team, including four matches at the 2003 FIFA Confederations Cup.

References

External links

Arnulfo Valentierra's CV

1974 births
Living people
Sportspeople from Barranquilla
Colombian footballers
Colombia international footballers
2003 FIFA Confederations Cup players
Once Caldas footballers
América de Cali footballers
Al Wahda FC players
Al-Ittihad Kalba SC players
Cienciano footballers
Peñarol players
Club Bolívar players
Unión Magdalena footballers
Club Aurora players
Categoría Primera A players
Uruguayan Primera División players
Colombian expatriate footballers
Expatriate footballers in the United Arab Emirates
Expatriate footballers in Peru
Expatriate footballers in Uruguay
Expatriate footballers in Bolivia
Colombian expatriate sportspeople in Bolivia
UAE Pro League players
Association football midfielders
Colombian expatriate sportspeople in Peru
Colombian expatriate sportspeople in Uruguay
20th-century Colombian people